János Komlós (born 23 May 1942, in Budapest) is a Hungarian-American mathematician, working in probability theory and discrete mathematics. He has been a professor of mathematics at Rutgers University since 1988. He graduated from the Eötvös Loránd University, then became a fellow at the Mathematical Institute of the Hungarian Academy of Sciences. Between 1984–1988 he worked at the University of California, San Diego.

Notable results
 Komlós' theorem: He proved that every L1-bounded sequence of real functions contains a subsequence such that the arithmetic means of all its subsequences converge pointwise almost everywhere. In probabilistic terminology, the theorem is as follows. Let ξ1,ξ2,... be a sequence of random variables such that E[ξ1],E[ξ2],... is bounded. Then there exist a subsequence ξ'1, ξ'2,... and a random variable β such that for each further subsequence η1,η2,... of ξ'0, ξ'1,...  we have (η1+...+ηn)/n → β a.s.
 With Miklós Ajtai and Endre Szemerédi he proved the ct2/log t upper bound for the Ramsey number R(3,t). The corresponding lower bound was established by Jeong Han Kim only in 1995, and this result earned him a Fulkerson Prize.

 The same team of authors  developed the optimal Ajtai–Komlós–Szemerédi sorting network.
 Komlós and Szemerédi proved that if G is a random graph on n vertices  with

edges, where c is a fixed real number, then the probability that G has a Hamiltonian circuit converges to

 With Gábor Sárközy and Endre Szemerédi he proved the so-called blow-up lemma which claims that the regular pairs in Szemerédi's regularity lemma are similar to complete bipartite graphs when considering the embedding of graphs with bounded degrees.
 Komlós worked on Heilbronn's problem; he,  János Pintz and Szemerédi disproved Heilbronn's conjecture.   
 Komlós also wrote highly cited papers on sums of random variables, space-efficient representations of sparse sets, random matrices, the Szemerédi regularity lemma, and derandomization.

Degrees, awards
Komlós received his Ph.D. in 1967 from Eötvös Loránd University under the supervision of Alfréd Rényi. In 1975 he received the Alfréd Rényi Prize, a prize established for  researchers of the Alfréd Rényi Institute of Mathematics. In 1998 he was elected as an external member to the Hungarian Academy of Sciences.

See also
 Komlós–Major–Tusnády approximation

References

1942 births
Living people
20th-century Hungarian mathematicians
21st-century Hungarian mathematicians
Members of the Hungarian Academy of Sciences
Theoretical computer scientists
Eötvös Loránd University alumni
Rutgers University faculty